A nonce word (also called an occasionalism) is a lexeme created for a single occasion to solve an immediate problem of communication.

Some nonce words may acquire a fixed meaning inferred from context and use, possibly even becoming an established part of the language, at which point they stop being nonce words. Some nonce words may be essentially meaningless and disposable, but they are useful for exactly that reason—the words  "wug" and "blicket" for instance were invented by researchers to be used in exercises in child language testing.

Lexicology
The term is used because such a word is created "for the nonce" (i.e., for the time being, or this once). All nonce words are also neologisms, that is, recent or relatively new words that have not been fully accepted into mainstream or common use.  The term nonce word in this sense is due to James Murray, the first editor of the Oxford English Dictionary.:25

In child development studies

Nonce words are sometimes used to study the development of language in children because they allow researchers to test how children treat words of which they have no prior knowledge. This permits inferences about the default assumptions children make about new word meanings, syntactic structure, etc. "Wug" is among the earliest known nonce words used in language learning studies, and is best known for its use in Jean Berko's "Wug test", in which children were presented with a novel object, called a wug, and then shown multiple instances of the object and asked to complete a sentence that elicits a plural form—e.g., "This is a wug. Now there are two of them. There are two...?" The use of the plural form "wugs" by the children suggests that they have applied a plural rule to the form, and that this knowledge is not specific to prior experience with the word but applies to most English nouns, whether familiar or novel.

Nancy N. Soja, Susan Carey, and Elizabeth Spelke used the nonce words "blicket," "stad," "mell," "coodle," "doff," "tannin," "fitch," and "tulver" when testing to see if children's knowledge of the distinction between non-solid substances and solid objects preceded or followed their knowledge of the distinction between mass nouns and count nouns.

In literature 

A poem by Seamus Heaney entitled "Nonce Words" is included in his collection District and Circle. Fluddle was reported by David Crystal, which he understood to mean a water spillage between a puddle and a flood, invented by the speaker because no suitable word existed. Crystal speculated in 1995 that it might enter the English language if it proved popular. Bouba and kiki is used to demonstrate a connection between the sound of words and their meaning. Grok, coined by Robert Heinlein in Stranger in a Strange Land, is now used by many to mean "deeply and intuitively understand". The poem "Jabberwocky" is full of nonce words, with two of them, chortle and galumph, entering into common use. The novel Finnegans Wake used quark as a nonce word; the physicist Murray Gell-Mann adopted it as the name of a subatomic particle.

See also

 Foobar
 Glokaya kuzdra
 Hapax legomenon
 Metasyntactic variable
 Nonsense word
 Placeholder name
 Protologism
 Pseudoword
 Sniglet

References

 
Types of words
Word coinage